The 2019–20 Irani Cup was the 58th edition of the Irani Cup, a first-class cricket competition in India, at the end of the domestic season. It was scheduled to be played as a one-off match between Saurashtra, the winners of the 2019–20 Ranji Trophy, and a Rest of India cricket team, from 18 to 22 March 2020. Vidarbha had won the previous tournament.

On 13 March 2020, the Board of Control for Cricket in India (BCCI) announced that the match would take place behind closed doors due to the COVID-19 pandemic. The following day, the BCCI confirmed that all domestic cricket in India was suspended due to coronavirus, including the Irani Cup. However, the cancelled match was played as an opening match of the 2022–23 Irani Cup season from 1 to 5 October 2022.

Squads

Match

References

Notes

External links
 Series home at ESPN Cricinfo

First-class cricket matches
2020 in Indian cricket
Irani Cup
Irani Cup
Irani Cup
Irani Cup